The National Youth Orchestra of the Netherlands (NJO) is the national youth orchestra of the Netherlands, founded in 1957. It consists of young musicians between 18 and 26 years of age.

It has appeared with conductors including Philippe Herreweghe, Iván Fischer, Jaap van Zweden, Reinbert de Leeuw and Oliver Knussen and soloists Nino Gvetadze, Hannes Minnaar, Isabelle van Keulen, Lucas Jussen, Harriet Krijgh, Alexander Romanovsky, Alexander Sitkovetsky and Claron McFadden.

The orchestra made its debut at Young Euro Classic in 2015. It is a member of the European Federation of National Youth Orchestras.

See also 
 List of youth orchestras

References 

Music education organizations
National youth orchestras
European youth orchestras
Dutch orchestras
Musical groups established in 1957